Jorge Nelson Orozco Quiroga conocido como el PIPA Orozco (born 24 January 2000 ) is a Bolivian footballer who plays in Bolivian Primera División for Club Blooming.

He made his debut aged 20 for Bolivia on the 13 October 2020 against Argentina.

References

External links
 

Living people
2000 births
Bolivian footballers
Bolivian Primera División players
Bolivia international footballers
Club Blooming players
Association football forwards